Kitsumkalum Provincial Park is a provincial park in British Columbia, Canada. It is located between the Kitsumkalum River and the Zymagotitz River.

References

Skeena Country
Provincial parks of British Columbia
Year of establishment missing